In arithmetic combinatorics, Szemerédi's theorem is a result concerning arithmetic progressions in subsets of the integers. In 1936, Erdős and Turán conjectured that every set of integers A with positive natural density contains a k-term arithmetic progression for every k. Endre Szemerédi proved the conjecture in 1975.

Statement
A subset A of the natural numbers is said to have positive upper density if

.

Szemerédi's theorem asserts that a subset of the natural numbers with positive upper density contains infinitely many arithmetic progressions of length k for all positive integers k.

An often-used equivalent finitary version of the theorem states that for every positive integer k and real number , there exists a positive integer

such that every subset of  {1, 2, ..., N} of size at least δN contains an arithmetic progression of length k.

Another formulation uses the function rk(N), the size of the largest subset of {1, 2, ..., N} without an arithmetic progression of length k. Szemerédi's theorem is equivalent to the asymptotic bound

.

That is, rk(N) grows less than linearly with N.

History
Van der Waerden's theorem, a precursor of Szemerédi's theorem, was proven in 1927.

The cases k = 1 and k = 2  of Szemerédi's theorem are trivial.  The case k = 3, known as Roth's theorem, was established in 1953 by Klaus Roth via an adaptation of the Hardy–Littlewood circle method. Endre Szemerédi proved the case k = 4 through combinatorics. Using an approach similar to the one he used for the case k = 3, Roth gave a second proof for this in 1972.

The general case was settled in 1975, also by Szemerédi, who developed an ingenious and complicated extension of his previous combinatorial argument for k = 4 (called "a masterpiece of combinatorial reasoning" by Erdős).  Several other proofs are now known, the most important being those by Hillel Furstenberg in 1977, using ergodic theory, and by Timothy Gowers in 2001, using both Fourier analysis and combinatorics. Terence Tao has called the various proofs of Szemerédi's theorem a "Rosetta stone" for connecting disparate fields of mathematics.

Quantitative bounds
It is an open problem to determine the exact growth rate of rk(N). The best known general bounds are

where . The lower bound is due to O'Bryant building on the work of Behrend, Rankin, and Elkin. The upper bound is due to Gowers.

For small k, there are tighter bounds than the general case. When k = 3, Bourgain, Heath-Brown, Szemerédi, and Sanders provided increasingly smaller upper bounds. The current best bounds are

due to O'Bryant and Bloom respectively.

For k = 4, Green and Tao proved that

for some c > 0.

Extensions and generalizations

A multidimensional generalization of Szemerédi's theorem was first proven by Hillel Furstenberg and Yitzhak Katznelson using ergodic theory. Timothy Gowers,  Vojtěch Rödl and Jozef Skokan with Brendan Nagle, Rödl, and Mathias Schacht, and Terence Tao provided combinatorial proofs.

Leibman and Bergelson's result also holds in a multidimensional setting.

The finitary version of Szemerédi's theorem can be generalized to finite additive groups including vector spaces over finite fields. The finite field analog can be used as a model for understanding the theorem in the natural numbers. The problem of obtaining bounds in the k=3 case of Szemerédi's theorem in the vector space  is known as the cap set problem.

The Green–Tao theorem asserts the prime numbers contain arbitrary long arithmetic progressions. It is not implied by Szemerédi's theorem because the primes have density 0 in the natural numbers. As part of their proof, Ben Green and Tao introduced a "relative" Szemerédi theorem which applies to subsets of the integers (even those with 0 density) satisfying certain pseudorandomness conditions. A more general relative Szemerédi theorem has since been given by David Conlon, Jacob Fox, and Yufei Zhao.

The Erdős conjecture on arithmetic progressions would imply both Szemerédi's theorem and the Green–Tao theorem.

See also
 Problems involving arithmetic progressions
 Ergodic Ramsey theory
 Arithmetic combinatorics
 Szemerédi regularity lemma

Notes

Further reading

External links
 PlanetMath source for initial version of this page
 Announcement by Ben Green and Terence Tao – the preprint is available at math.NT/0404188
 Discussion of Szemerédi's theorem (part 1 of 5)
 Ben Green and Terence Tao: Szemerédi's theorem on Scholarpedia
 
 

Additive combinatorics
Ramsey theory
Theorems in combinatorics
Theorems in number theory